Proragrotis was a genus of moths of the family Noctuidae, it is now considered a synonym of Dichagyris.

Former species
 Proragrotis dubitata McDunnough, 1933
 Proragrotis longidens (Smith, 1890)

References
Natural History Museum Lepidoptera genus database
Proragrotis at funet

Noctuinae
Obsolete arthropod taxa